Lucian Newhall House may refer to:

Lucian Newhall House (Davenport, Iowa)
Lucian Newhall House (Lynn, Massachusetts)